The Otherwise Award, originally known as the James Tiptree Jr. Award, is an American annual literary prize for works of science fiction or fantasy that expand or explore one's understanding of gender. It was initiated in February 1991 by science fiction authors Pat Murphy and Karen Joy Fowler, subsequent to a discussion at WisCon.

In addition to the award itself, the judges publish an Honor List, which they describe as "a strong part of the award's identity and ... used by many readers as a recommended reading list."

The award was originally named for Alice B. Sheldon, who wrote under the pseudonym James Tiptree Jr. Due to controversy over the appropriateness of naming an award after Tiptree, the committee administering the award announced on October 13, 2019, that the award would be renamed the Otherwise Award.

Background

Choice of the Tiptree name
By choosing a masculine nom de plume, having her stories accepted under that name and winning awards with them, Alice Sheldon helped demonstrate that the division between male and female science fiction writing was illusory. Years after "Tiptree" first published science fiction, Sheldon wrote some work under the female pen name "Raccoona Sheldon"; later, the science fiction world discovered that "Tiptree" had been female all along. This discovery led to widespread discussion over which aspects of writing, if any, have an intrinsic gender. To remind audiences of the role gender plays in both reading and writing, the award was named in Sheldon's honor at the suggestion of Karen Joy Fowler.

Controversy and name change
In 2019, controversy arose over the appropriateness of naming an award after Tiptree. In 1987, Alice Sheldon shot and killed her ailing husband Huntington Sheldon before killing herself in the same manner. Although some have called the killing a "suicide pact" based on Sheldon's personal writings, others characterize the act as "caregiver murder"—i.e., the murder of a disabled person by the person responsible for caring for them. In light of these allegations, the Tiptree Motherboard received requests to change the name of the award. On September 2, 2019, in response to these requests, the Motherboard made a statement that "a change to the name of the Tiptree Award is [not] warranted now"; but nine days later, on September 11, they announced that the award "can’t go on under its existing name".

On October 13, 2019, the Tiptree Motherboard released an announcement stating that the Tiptree Award would become the Otherwise Award. The name refers to "the act of imagining gender otherwise" at the core of what the award has always honored, as well as being "wise to the experience of being the other". The title also draws from the Black queer scholarship of Ashon Crawley around what is termed "otherwise politics". According to the statement, "Otherwise means finding different directions to move in—toward newly possible places, by means of emergent and multiple pathways and methods."

Administration
Fundraising efforts for the Tiptree include publications (two cookbooks), "feminist bake sales", and auctions. The Tiptree cookbook The Bakery Men Don't See, edited by WisCon co-founder Jeanne Gomoll, was nominated for a 1992 Hugo Award. Tiptree Award juries traditionally consist of four female jurors and one male juror (the "token man"). The funds are administered by the "Tiptree Motherboard" (currently consisting of Murphy, Alexis Lothian, Gretchen Treu, and Sumana Harihareswara, with Fowler remaining closely involved).

Award to the Tiptree Motherboard
In 2011, the Science Fiction Research Association gave its 2011 "Thomas D. Clareson Award for Distinguished Service" to the Tiptree Motherboard. The Clareson Award was presented to the Tiptree Motherboard for "outstanding service activities – promotion of SF teaching and study, editing, reviewing, editorial writing, publishing, organizing meetings, mentoring, and leadership in SF/fantasy organizations".

Anthologies
Selections of the winners, various short-listed fiction, and essays have appeared in four Tiptree-related collections, Flying Cups and Saucers (1999) and a series of annual anthologies published by Tachyon Publications of San Francisco. These include:
 Flying Cups and Saucers: Gender Explorations in Science Fiction and Fantasy edited by The Secret Feminist Cabal and Debbie Notkin (1999)
 The James Tiptree Award Anthology 1 edited by Karen Joy Fowler, Pat Murphy, Debbie Notkin, and Jeffrey D. Smith (2005)
 The James Tiptree Award Anthology 2 edited by Karen Joy Fowler, Pat Murphy, Debbie Notkin, and Jeffrey D. Smith (2006)
 The James Tiptree Award Anthology 3 edited by Karen Joy Fowler, Pat Murphy, Debbie Notkin, and Jeffrey D. Smith (2007)

Winners

 Retrospective Award: Motherlines and Walk to the End of the World by Suzy McKee Charnas; The Left Hand of Darkness by Ursula K. Le Guin; The Female Man and When It Changed by Joanna Russ
 1991: A Woman of the Iron People by Eleanor Arnason, and White Queen by Gwyneth Jones
 1992: China Mountain Zhang by Maureen F. McHugh
 1993: Ammonite by Nicola Griffith
 1994: The Matter of Seggri by Ursula K. Le Guin, and Larque on the Wing by Nancy Springer
 1995: Waking the Moon by Elizabeth Hand, and The Memoirs of Elizabeth Frankenstein by Theodore Roszak
 1996: Mountain Ways by Ursula K. Le Guin, and The Sparrow by Mary Doria Russell
 1997: Black Wine by Candas Jane Dorsey, and Travels with the Snow Queen by Kelly Link
 1998: Congenital Agenesis of Gender Ideation by Raphael Carter
 1999: The Conqueror's Child by Suzy McKee Charnas
 2000: Wild Life by Molly Gloss
 2001: The Kappa Child by Hiromi Goto
 2002: Light by M. John Harrison, and Stories for Men by John Kessel
 2003: Set This House in Order: A Romance Of Souls by Matt Ruff
 2004: Camouflage by Joe Haldeman, and Not Before Sundown by Johanna Sinisalo
 2005: Air by Geoff Ryman
 2006: The Orphan's Tales: In the Night Garden by Catherynne M. Valente, and Half Life by Shelley Jackson; special recognition for Julie Phillips' biography of James Tiptree Jr.: James Tiptree, Jr.: The Double Life of Alice B. Sheldon
 2007: The Carhullan Army by Sarah Hall
 2008: The Knife of Never Letting Go by Patrick Ness, and Filter House by Nisi Shawl
 2009: Cloud and Ashes: Three Winter’s Tales by Greer Gilman, and Ōoku: The Inner Chambers by Fumi Yoshinaga
 2010: Baba Yaga Laid an Egg by Dubravka Ugresic
 2011: Redwood and Wildfire by Andrea Hairston
 2012: The Drowning Girl by Caitlin R. Kiernan, and Ancient, Ancient by Kiini Ibura Salaam
 2013: Rupetta by N. A. Sulway
 2014: The Girl in the Road by Monica Byrne, and My Real Children by Jo Walton
 2015: The New Mother by Eugene Fischer, and Lizard Radio by Pat Schmatz
 2016: When the Moon Was Ours by Anna-Marie McLemore
 2017: Who Runs The World? by Virginia Bergin
 2018: They Will Dream in the Garden by Gabriela Damián Miravete
 2019: Freshwater by Akwaeke Emezi
 2020: Ife-Iyoku, the Tale of Imadeyunuagbon by Oghenechovwe Donald Ekpeki
 2021 (tie): Light from Uncommon Stars by Ryka Aoki
 2021 (tie): Sorrowland by Rivers Solomon

See also
 Gender in speculative fiction
 Sense of Gender Awards
 Sex and sexuality in speculative fiction
 Women in speculative fiction
 Women science fiction authors

References

Further reading

External links
 

 
Awards established in 1991
Fantasy awards
LGBT literary awards
Lists of speculative fiction-related award winners and nominees
Science fiction awards
Gender in speculative fiction